Vidius is a genus of skippers in the family Hesperiidae.

Species
Recognised species in the genus Vidius include:
 Vidius felus Mielke, 1968
 Vidius fraus (Godman, 1900)
 Vidius vidius (Mabille, 1891)

Former species
Vidius anna (Mabille, 1898) - transferred to Moeris anna (Mabille, 1898)
Vidius fido Evans, 1955 - transferred to Fidius fido (Evans, 1955)
Vidius laska Evans, 1955 - transferred to Psoralis laska (Evans, 1955)
Vidius nappa Evans, 1955 - transferred to Nastra nappa (Evans, 1955)
Vidius nostra Evans, 1955 - transferred to Rectava nostra (Evans, 1955)
Vidius ochraceus Mielke, 1980 - transferred to Fidius ochraceus (Mielke, 1980)

References

Natural History Museum Lepidoptera genus database

Hesperiinae
Hesperiidae genera